The 1945 Football League War Cup Final was the last final of the Football League War Cup, a cup competition held in England during the Second World War as a replacement for the suspended FA Cup. The match was a play-off between the winners of the North and South competitions, respectively Bolton Wanderers and Chelsea. The match took place on 2 June 1945, and was staged at Stamford Bridge, Chelsea's home ground. Bolton won the match 2–1.


Match details

Notes

References

War Cup Final 1945
War Cup Final 1945
1944–45 in English football
Football League War Cup
Football League War Cup Final
Football League War Cup Final
Football League War Cup Final